Ficus  pantoniana, commonly known as the climbing fig, is a species of fig tree, native to Australia. It is found in lowland rainforests on the Cape York Peninsula in northern Queensland. It is a woody climber which may reach 3–6 m in height. It was described by botanist George King in 1887 from a specimen collected in New Guinea, Ficus nugenti by Karel Domin in 1921, and F. scandens var. australis by Bailey are synonyms.

References

External links

pantoniana
Rosales of Australia
Trees of Australia
Flora of Queensland